Michael Mancini, M.D., portrayed by Thomas Calabro, is a fictional character from the 1990s prime time drama Melrose Place and the 2009 series revival of the same name.

Presented originally as an honest and devoted husband with a career driven mind-set, Michael became a very different character over the course of the series, turning into a notorious womanizer and schemer.

Michael Mancini is notable for being the only character who was present for the original show's entire run.

Storylines

Melrose Place
During the first season, Michael begins as a very dedicated husband to Jane, and the show chronicles their troubles as a couple. Towards the end of the first season, Michael has an affair with colleague, Kimberly Shaw, causing Jane to file for divorce and kick him out of their apartment.

Michael then moves into a beach house with Kimberly, but yet again has an affair with his ex-sister-in-law Sydney Andrews, Jane's younger sister. Kimberly breaks up with Michael but they briefly get back together when he asks her to marry him. She happily agrees but their bliss is very short since they get into a serious car accident. Michael is injured badly, but Kimberly is left comatose and is taken back home by her mother, who later claims that Kimberly later died of her injuries. Meanwhile, Sydney blackmails Michael into marrying her and their marriage is mostly one sided. When Kimberly shows up alive at the end of season two, he goes back to her and divorces Sydney. He later marries Kimberly in season three.

Michael's marriage to Kimberly ends when he cheats on her with Amanda Woodward, causing Kimberly to have a mental breakdown. After Kimberly blows up the apartment complex, he gets back together with Sydney. While he was dating Sydney again, he tried to have an affair with his ex-wife, Jane, but whom Sydney drugs. After finding out Sydney drugged Jane, he breaks up with her, and gets back together with Kimberly. Kimberly and Michael later renew their vows.

After Kimberly falls ill from a brain aneurysm, she hires a prostitute named Megan to have an affair with Michael so he can enjoy sex. However, things turn sour when Michael and Megan's relationship becomes more than just sexual. Michael and Kimberly then divorce for good, and he marries Megan in Las Vegas.

In season seven, Michael begins a relationship with Lexi Sterling who breaks up with him after his marriage proposal.

Melrose Place (2009)
In the spin-off/revival of the show, Michael is shown to have married a woman named Vanessa, and has a son named David Breck (played by Shaun Sipos), one of the main characters. He is still a very unfaithful man, cheating on his wife with both Sydney (prior to her death) and her daughter, Violet Foster.

References

Melrose Place (1992 TV series) characters
Melrose Place (2009 TV series) characters
Fictional characters from New York City
Fictional blackmailers
Male villains
Fictional physicians
Fictional surgeons
Television characters introduced in 1992